Keith Edwards may refer to:
 Keith Edwards (footballer, born 1957), English football player
 Keith Edwards (footballer, born 1944), football player for Chester City
 W. Keith Edwards, American computer scientist
 Keith Edwards (cricketer) (born 1951), former English cricketer
 Keith Edwards (rugby league) (born 1947), Australian rugby league footballer